Vitaliy Sobolev (25 January 1930 – 1995) was an footballer from the former Soviet Union who played for FC Dynamo Kyiv.

In 1956 Sobolev played a game for the Ukraine national team at the Spartakiad of the Peoples of the USSR.

References

External links
 Profile at footballfacts

1930 births
1995 deaths
Soviet footballers
Association football defenders
FC Shakhtar Donetsk players
PFC CSKA Moscow players
FC CSKA Kyiv players
FC Dynamo Kyiv players
MFC Mykolaiv players